Patrus Ananias de Sousa (Bocaiúva, 26 January 1952) is a Brazilian lawyer and politician, member of the Workers' Party (PT). He was Minister of Agrarian Development during the second term of president Dilma Rousseff.

Biography

Mayor of Belo Horizonte
In 1992, he was elected mayor of Belo Horizonte, with Célio de Castro (PSB) as Vice Mayor, defeating former mayor Maurício Campos (PL), who was defeated in the second round, and Sérgio Ferrara (PMDB), the then federal deputy Aécio Neves (PSDB), who finished in 3rd place.

His term as mayor was marked with structural reforms in city administration, with changes in city hall organization, in public planning, and in public politics, engaging in an agenda of social development, with politics of fighting against poverty, of food security, of promotion of jobs and income, as well as investments in education and health. Implemented, also, the participative budget. His administration was awarded by the United Nations Organization as model of public administration.

Federal Deputy
In 2002, he was elected federal deputy by the PT, reaching more than 520,000 votes. He is, until nowadays, the biggest voting get by a candidate to federal deputy in Minas Gerais, corresponding to 5.4% of the valid votes. In the Federal Chamber, assumed the vice presidency of the Constitution and Justice Committee and became member of the Ethics and Parliamentary Decour Council. Participated, also, the Regional Development and Urban and Interior Development Committees.

Minister of Social Development
In 2004, in a context of crisis involving the social politics promoted by the Federal Government, Ananias was invited by president Lula to assume the Ministry of Social Development and Fight Against Hunger, an office in which the minister was kept until March 2010. It was during his administration as minister that Bolsa Família was implemented, a program of the Federal Government for families in situations of poverty or extreme poverty. In this period, almost 13 million families were granted with the Bolsa Família.

Election for Mayor of Belo Horizonte
In the beginning of 2010, disputed against former mayor of Belo Horizonte, Fernando Pimentel, the PT primaries for Governor of Minas Gerais. He loses the nomination, but, on 31 March 2010, leaves the Ministry to run in the elections, in the condition of candidate for Vice Governor in the opposition ticket with the then Minister of Communications senator Hélio Costa. On 7 June 2010, officialize his candidacy for Vice Governor of the State of Minas Gerais, along with Hélio Costa. They were defeated by the then Governor Antônio Anastasia (PSDB), elected Vice Governor in 2006 along with Aécio Neves, who left the office to run for Senator.

In 2012, he again ran for Mayor of Belo Horizonte against Márcio Lacerda (PSB), being defeated in the first round. Got 40% of the votes, against 54% of his opponent. In that election, he was chosen after the rupture of the alliance PT-PSB, then in the command of the state's capital, which was already sealed, having the federal deputy Miguel Corrêa, close to the minister Fernando Pimentel, as Vice Mayor of Márcio Lacerda.

Minister of Agrarian Development
On 29 December 2014, he was officially announced as new Minister of Agrarian Development of the second cabinet of Dilma Rousseff. On 14 April 2016, he left temporarily the Ministry because of the voting of the impeachment proceedings against Dilma Rousseff. Returned to office in 19 April, whom he was kept until the Rousseff's suspension and the swearing-in of acting president Michel Temer.

He is also a member of the World Future Council. https://www.worldfuturecouncil.org/

References

External links
 

|-

|-

|-

|-

1952 births
Living people
Workers' Party (Brazil) politicians
Members of the Chamber of Deputies (Brazil) from Minas Gerais
Government ministers of Brazil
Brazilian people of Lebanese descent